library@chinatown is a library in Chinatown, Singapore. It is located inside Chinatown Point. The nearest MRT station is Chinatown MRT station.

History 
The library was officially opened on 31 January 2013 by then Acting Minister for Culture, Community and Youth and Senior Minister of State, Ministry of Communications and Information Mr Lawrence Wong. It is NLB's first library run by volunteers. The library was designed by Multiply Architects LLP and the library was completed in 2012.

Layout 
The library is on the 4th floor of the mall. There is a small section of materials in commonly spoken Chinese dialects. There is a section for electronic newspapers.

Gallery

See also 
 National Library Board
 Libraries in Singapore

Notes

References

External links 
 Official website

Chinatown, Singapore
Libraries in Singapore
2013 establishments in Singapore
Libraries established in 2013